Southcentral Kentucky Community and Technical College (SKYCTC) is a public community college in Bowling Green, Kentucky.  It is an open-admissions college and a member of the Kentucky Community and Technical College System. The college is accredited by the Southern Association of Colleges and Schools.

History
Southcentral Kentucky Community and Technical College was established as Western Trade School in 1939 and was operated by Western Kentucky State Teachers College (later Western Kentucky University (WKU).) In 1962, the school became independent of WKU, and underwent two name changes before joining KCTCS in 1997 and becoming Bowling Green Technical College. On December 7, 2012, the KCTCS Board of Regents approved a request to change the name to Southcentral Kentucky Community and Technical College, recognizing the fact that SACS had designated it as a comprehensive community college and granted approval for it to award the Associate in Arts and Associate in Science degrees.

Service area
Southcentral Kentucky Community and Technical College has a 10 county service area. Included are:

Allen County
Barren County
Edmonson County
Hart County
Logan County
Metcalf County
Monroe County
Simpson County
Warren County

Campuses
Southcentral Kentucky Community and Technical College maintains six campuses:

Main Campus
Glasgow Health Campus
Glasgow Technology Campus
KATI Campus
Transpark Center
Franklin-Simpson Center

References

External links
Official website

Buildings and structures in Bowling Green, Kentucky
Kentucky Community and Technical College System
Educational institutions established in 1939
Universities and colleges accredited by the Southern Association of Colleges and Schools
Education in Warren County, Kentucky
Education in Barren County, Kentucky
Buildings and structures in Barren County, Kentucky
Education in Simpson County, Kentucky
Buildings and structures in Simpson County, Kentucky
1939 establishments in Kentucky